"Like Humans Do" is the fourth track from David Byrne's Look into the Eyeball and was also released as a single in 2001. Most notably, the radio edit version of the song (which omits the line referring to cannabis) was selected by Microsoft as the sample music for Windows XP to demonstrate the new Windows Media Player, though it was only included in early releases of the operating system. It was also included as a sample track on the Rio Karma media player.

The song was also featured on Byrne's 2007 live album Live from Austin, Texas and 2004's Live at Union Chapel. In the latter film, he explains that the song is about trying to love human beings despite their failings, by taking a "Martian's perspective" on humanity and trying to accept them for what they are.

Track listing
"Like Humans Do" (Radio Edit)
"All Over Me"
"Princess"

Notes
The B-sides were later appended to a re-release of Look into the Eyeball.

Personnel
The song was written by David Byrne and arranged by Thom Bell, with string and horn contracting by Sandra Park.
David Byrne – vocals, guitar
Nick Cords – viola
Bruno Eicher – violin
Paul Frazier – bass guitar
Dawn Hannay – viola
Vivek Kamath – viola
Lisa Kim – violin
Eileen Moon – cello
Suzanne Ornstein – violin
Sandra Park – violin
Dan Reed – violin
Robert Rinehart – viola
Laura Seaton – violin
Fiona Simon – violin
Alan Stepanksy – cello
Sharon Yamada – violin
Herb Besson – trombone
Bob Carlisle – French horn
Michael Davis – trombone
Jim Hayes – trumpet
Rodd Kadleck – trumpet
Stewart Rose – French horn
Karen Griffin – piccolo
Roger Rosenberg – baritone saxophone
Shawn Pelton – drums
Mauro Refosco – percussion

Release history

References

External links
Look into the Eyeball on DavidByrne.com

2001 singles
David Byrne songs
Songs written by David Byrne
Microsoft Windows sample music
Virgin Records singles
Song recordings produced by David Byrne
Windows XP
2001 songs